The French submarine Mariotte was a submarine built for the French Navy prior to World War I. Intended to accompany the fleet, she was designed for high speed on the surface. Although the navy was unsatisfied with her performance on the surface, the boat had a higher underwater speed than any French submarine before or during the following 35 years. Mariotte was plagued with engine problems during her construction and the navy spent years fixing the various issues before finally commissioning her five years after beginning construction. During the war, she participated in the Dardanelles Campaign, but had to be scuttled after she became entangled in the cables of a minefield on her first attempt to penetrate the Dardanelles.

Design and description
The winning design, by Constructor, First Class (Ingénieur de 1ère classe) Charles Radiguer, was optimized for good sea-keeping qualities and high speed with moderate buoyancy, a long, thin single hull, and high freeboard. The most unusual feature of his design was the prominent forecastle that was built atop the forward part of the pressure hull, while the rear was virtually awash. This odd configuration gave the boat her nickname of toothbrush (brosse à dents).

The submarine actually displaced slightly more than planned,  surfaced and  submerged. This latter was faired into the rear of the forecastle. Two lead weights were located in the keel and could be dropped in an emergency.

Her hull was divided into nine compartments and she was fitted with five internal trim tanks, an internal central ballast tank and three external ballast tanks. Mariotte had two rudders, one above the waterline for submerged use and the other below the waterline for regular use. She had two sets of diving planes, fore and aft, to control her depth below the water. The boat was evaluated in 1914 and the commission felt that she was generally successful except for her surface speed and range. It noted that she had problems with a following sea as the superstructure rapidly filled with water, but drained slowly so that she was much heavier by the bow and would tend to wallow. It also felt that she was insufficiently buoyant and had mediocre stability on the surface.

For surface running, the boat was powered by two Sautter & Harlé six-cylinder,  diesel engines, each driving a  propeller. When submerged each propeller was driven by a Breguet  electric motor using electricity from two 124-cell batteries. Mariotte could reach  on the surface and  underwater. This latter speed was a record that would not be exceeded by a French submarine for 35 years.

She was armed with four internal  torpedo tubes in the bow and two Drzewiecki drop collars in the forecastle. Two reloads were stowed internally, which gave her a total of eight torpedoes. During World War I, the boat probably used Modèle 1911V torpedoes.

Construction and service

Mariotte, named after the physicist Edme Mariotte, was ordered from the Arsenal de Cherbourg on 31 December 1906. The boat was laid down on 30 March 1908 and launched on 2 February 1911 with only the starboard electric motor in place. The port electric motor was under repair at the time and was installed from 3 May to 21 June and a brief series of trials were conducted. The boat was refitted and further repairs were made to the port-side motor, although continuing problems with her propulsion system often immobilized Mariotte into 1912. She was able, however, to conduct diving, torpedo and underwater speed trials in August and September 1911. The boat was lightly damaged when the air heater of a Modèle 1909R torpedo exploded in its tube on 27 December. Her diesel engines, three years delayed by problems during factory testing, were installed from 1 March to 28 July 1912. They were judged satisfactory after the oil sump and the compressors were changed. After repeated breakdowns, Mariotte conducted her testing of the diesels from 23 October to 11 December and she was finally commissioned (armament définitif) on 5 February 1913 after a complete overhaul of her propulsion system.

The boat was assigned to the 2nd Division (escadrille) of the Light Squadron of submarines on 16 January and she joined them at Calais on 11 February. Mariotte visited Brest on 20 February and was inspected by Rear Admiral Charles Eugène Favereau. During the inspection the oil-fired galley stove in the forecastle exploded, lightly burning two sailors. The boat was in Calais for the visit of King Christian X of Denmark later in the year.

When World War I began in August 1914, Mariotte was transferred to the Mediterranean Squadron at Toulon where she patrolled off the coast of Provence. In July 1915, she was transferred to Mudros to attempt to penetrate the Dardanelles. After making a reconnaissance flight over the straits and having studied the reports of the British submarines that had successfully entered the Dardanelles, Lieutenant de vaisseau Auguste Farbre ordered his crew to cast off on the evening of 25 July. The boat became entangled in the cables and when she surfaced in an unsuccessful attempt to free herself, she was immediately engaged by a Turkish gun battery at close range. Mariotte could not submerge because her conning tower had been penetrated by shells so Farbre decided to scuttle the boat and surrender. The Turks ceased fire when he signaled his surrender and so his crew was able to destroy documents and equipment before opening the seacocks to sink the submarine.

See also 
List of submarines of France

References

Bibliography

External links

 French Submarines: 1863 - Now

World War I submarines of France
1911 ships
Ships built in France
Maritime incidents in 1915
World War I shipwrecks in the Dardanelles
Scuttled vessels
Shipwrecks of Turkey